Glenleigh is a rural locality in the North Burnett Region, Queensland, Australia. In the  Glenleigh had a population of 33 people.

History 
Glen Leigh State School opened on 27 September 1937 and closed in December 1961. It was located on the eastern corner of Glenleigh Road and Booths Road (approx ).

In the  Glenleigh had a population of 33 people.

References

Further reading 

  — includes Glen Leigh State School

North Burnett Region
Localities in Queensland